Barunah Plains Homestead is a heritage-listed homestead at 4484 Hamilton Highway, Hesse, Victoria, Australia. The original house, which was designed by architects Davidson and Henderson, dates from 1866; subsequent additions and alterations were made in the late nineteenth century and in the 1900s-1910s. The homestead also comprises large formal gardens, a bakehouse and laundry, stables, coach-house and implement shed (south-west of the homestead), a woolshed, two bluestone cottages north-east of the homestead, and a ram shed located 1 km south.

The property is strongly associated with the grazing history of the Western District, and prior to subdivision for soldier settlement in 1946, was the largest sheep station in Victoria. The homestead and outbuildings were listed on the Register of the National Estate on 14 May 1991; they are also classified by the National Trust of Australia and protected under the Golden Plains Shire Heritage Overlay.

Etymology 
The Barunah Plains property is located on the land of the Gulidjan people.  The word barunah is most likely a variation of the Gulidjan or Wathawurrung word for 'night', which was recorded in the nineteenth century as pooroonna and boorana on two independent Gulidjan vocabulary lists. This word has common features with the words for 'dark' in other western Victorian Aboriginal languages, such as puruyn in the Djab wurrung language.

History

The run on which the homestead sits was originally named The Long Waterhole. It was settled by Thomas Austin in 1846, who established a merino stud. It was sold to brothers Thomas and Philip Russell in 1851, who renamed the property Barunah Plains. The Weekly Times reported in 2000 that the Barunah Plains wool stud "has provided the genetic base for many of Australia's leading fine wool studs". At its peak, the station held over 50,000 sheep and was the largest sheep station in the state. It remained in the Russell family until 1978.

Graham Mills bought the property from the Russell family in 1978, and subsequently restored the homestead and surrounds. In the early 1990s, GW Mills and sons decided that they needed an alternative source of income to supplement their wool business, and opened the property as tourist accommodation, using parts of the homestead, two cottages and the former shearers' quarters. In 1995, he added a 9-hole golf course, using the shearers' quarters as a clubhouse. The clubhouse was ranked by BRW as the fifth-best in Victoria in 1998; the course was then in the process of expansion. That year, the property had 11,000 sheep, crops of wheat, barley and oats, and the tourist business. In 1998, the local council approved plans to create a country-club development, motel and conference centre at the site, but this did not eventuate.

In 1999, part of the property was sold off when the owners were unable to sell the property as a whole. It was bought by internet entrepreneur and politician Evan Thornley in 2001. He advertised the property for sale in 2012, at which time the Geelong Advertiser reported that potential buyers were visiting the property "in helicopters that cost almost half the property's $4.5 million-plus asking price."

Significance

Barunah Plains is a late nineteenth-century homestead development and is important for exhibiting a rich array of cultural features as follows: a collection of bluestone buildings including the homestead and outbuildings; and a homestead garden and parkland with a large attractively crafted timber gate, a timber pedestrian bridge, shrubberies, a sunken croquet lawn, a rose garden and mature trees (Criterion A.3).

Barunah Plains has a strong and long association with the grazing history of the western district, and thus with a major chapter of the history of Victoria (Criterion A.4).

The range of structures on the property, including bakery, laundry, cottages, implement shed, stables, coach house, woolshed and ram building, is important for the way it reflects a functioning western district sheep property founded in the nineteenth century. Additionally, the ram shed and the gate providing entry to the garden and park are unusual features. The garden is also important as an example of the Gardenesque design style, exhibiting the following style characteristics: a dominance of shrubberies with minimal lawn area; use of gravel paths; and use of trees with distinctive form as features (Criterion B.2).

Barunah Plains is important for technical and creative excellence exhibited in the evolved form of the bluestone house, the collection of substantial bluestone outbuildings, and in the 1890s garden design layout (Criterion F.1).

Description

Barunah Plains on the Hamilton Highway at Wingeel was established in the 1840s. Philip Russell, with John Simson and Thomas Russell, took over the property in 1851 and from 1856 Thomas, with other Russell family members, had the property. Barunah Plains remained in Russell family hands until 1978.

The oldest section of the homestead (which contains main rooms) dates from 1866 and was designed by architects, Davidson and Henderson, who designed a number of homesteads and other buildings in this part of Victoria. Additions were made later in the nineteenth century and major additions and alterations date from the 1900s to the 1910s. These early twentieth century works included the western wing with its polygonal window, filling in of the central courtyard to create an enormous lantern lit room with two fireplaces and refitting of parts of the older house, such as leadlights in the front door surround. The dates of the various outbuildings are unknown. In 1904 it was stated that the Barunah Plains Merino flock was 'the most noted in the western district', comprising 50,000 sheep on the 51,000 acres. The ram building is one unusual manifestation of this once very large sheep property, evidently the largest in Victoria when it was subdivided for soldier settlement in 1946.

Barunah Plains homestead is a large, single storey bluestone residence, comprising two main sections forming a U-shape around the rear courtyard, infilled in the 1900s to the 1910s. The eastern section of the building was built in 1866 to Davidson and Henderson's design. This eastern section is asymmetrically composed with a cast iron verandah at the north-east corner. The present front door faces east and is beside a projecting bay window and sheltered by a stone porch; this section may well be an addition. The north side elevation has a projecting bay windowed room with a higher roof crowned by cast iron cresting. Further west is the 1900s to the 1910s wing, comprising principal bedrooms and intact bathrooms. On the western side of the old courtyard is a bluestone section reputed to be the oldest part and a timber section.

Immediately south of the rear of the house is the bluestone bakehouse and laundry. Further south again are the bluestone and timber station buildings, stables, coach house and implement shed, arranged to form a large courtyard. The garden encloses the homestead on the south, east, north and part of the west sides. Separating the garden and station outbuildings is a picket fence, which is the last surviving section of this fencing which was more extensive.

The garden has a layout dating from at least the 1890s and has much mature planting. The garden originally extended to the other side of the Warrambine Creek, but became badly overgrown in recent times. Warrambine Creek runs along the north side of the garden, and a sunken croquet lawn is just north-east of the house. The garden has 2ha of informal area and parkland, and 3ha of formal garden which includes a rose garden, orchard, kitchen garden, various shrubberies with small trees, a variety of shrubs and perennials, and mature pines, monkey puzzle trees, and cypresses. The garden has an approach through and attractive old style timber gate, and also across a timber pedestrian bridge, spanning the creek.

The T-shaped bluestone woolshed is on the other side of the creek, on a rise; its south wall is concealed by corrugated iron additions. There are two bluestone houses east of the woolshed, on the other side of the creek. The coursed bluestone ram shed has a slatted floor, with subfloor access doors below.

References

Attribution 
 Required attribution: © Commonwealth of Australia 2013.

1866 establishments in Australia
Houses in Victoria (Australia)
Victorian places listed on the defunct Register of the National Estate